The ASPIRE PAC (short for Asian Americans and Pacific Islanders Rising and Empowering Political Action Committee), formerly known as the Congressional Asian Pacific American Caucus Leadership PAC (CAPAC Leadership PAC), is a United States political action committee established in 2011 by Congresswoman Judy Chu (CA-27). The PAC focuses its efforts on supporting candidates of Asian American and Pacific Islander (AAPI) descent and those that support and promote the issues of the AAPI community. The CAPAC Leadership PAC offers a voice for the AAPI community and encourages active participation in the U.S. political process.

Through its support, the PAC welcomed six newly elected AAPI Members of Congress in the 2012 Elections: Sen. Mazie K. Hirono (HI), Rep. Ami Bera (CA-07), Rep. Tammy Duckworth (IL-08), Rep. Tulsi Gabbard (HI-02), Rep. Grace Meng (NY-06) and Rep. Mark Takano (CA-41). In the 2014 Elections, the PAC supported and welcomed new members Rep. Ted Lieu (CA-33) and Rep. Mark Takai (HI-01). Today, there are 14 AAPI Members of Congress.

In April 2016, Congresswoman Grace Meng was elected as PAC Chair, succeeding PAC founder Congresswoman Judy Chu. Chu became Immediate Past PAC Chair and continued her duties as Chair of the Congressional Asian Pacific American Caucus, the official Congressional caucus.

Board members 
 Chair: Congresswoman Grace Meng (D) (New York–6th)
 Immediate Past Chair: Congresswoman Judy Chu (D) (California–27th)
 Vice-Chair: Congressman Mike Honda (D) (California–17th)
 Senator Mazie K. Hirono (D) (Hawaii)
 Congresswoman Madeleine Bordallo (D) (Guam–Delegate)
 Congressman Ami Bera (D) (California–7th)
 Congresswoman Tammy Duckworth (D) (Illinois–8th)
 Congresswoman Barbara Lee (D) (California–9th)
 Congressman Ted Lieu (D) (California–33rd)
 Congresswoman Doris O. Matsui (D) (California–6th)
 Congressman Jerry McNerney (D) (California–9th)
 Congressman Gregorio Sablan (I) (Northern Mariana Islands–Delegate)
 Congresswoman Grace Napolitano (D) (California–32nd)
 Congresswoman Lucille Roybal-Allard (D) (California–40th)
 Congressman Mark Takai (D) (Hawaii–1st)
 Congressman Mark Takano (D) (California–41st)

List of chairs 
 Congresswoman Judy Chu (D) (California–27th), 2011–16
 Congresswoman Grace Meng (D) (New York–6th), 2016–Present

2016 endorsed candidates 
 Hillary Clinton for President of the United States
 Tammy Duckworth for Senate (IL)
 Chris Van Hollen for Senate (MD)
 Ami Bera for Congress (CA-07)
 Mike Honda for Congress (CA-17)
 Pramila Jayapal for Congress (WA-07)
 Raja Krishnamoorthi for Congress (IL-08)
 Grace Napolitano for Congress (CA-32)
 Scott Peters for Congress (CA-52)

2020 endorsed candidates
 Pritesh Gandhi for Congress (TX-10)
 Jackie Gordon for Congress (NY-02)
 Gina Ortiz Jones for Congress (TX-23)
 Kai Kahele for Congress (HI-02)
 Sri Preston Kulkarni for Congress (TX-22)
 Hiral Tipirneni for Congress (AZ-06)
 Candace Valenzuela for Congress (TX-24)
Sima Ladjevardian for Congress (TX-02)

See also 
 Asian Pacific Americans in the United States Congress
 Congressional Asian Pacific American Caucus

References

External links 
 

United States political action committees
Organizations established in 2011